Maciej Berbeka (17 October 1954 – 6 March 2013) was a Polish mountaineer and mountain guide. He and Tomasz Kowalski went missing on 6 March 2013 as they were descending from Broad Peak. They were declared dead two days later.

Berbeka's accomplishments include making the first winter ascent of the eight-thousanders Manaslu, on 12 January 1984, with Ryszard Gajewski; of Cho Oyu, on 12 February 1985, with Maciej Pawlikowski (the only winter ascent on eight-thousander made along a new route); He also climbed and summited Annapurna and Mount Everest. He was the first person in the world to have reached 8000 m winter in Karakoram – Rocky Summit (8028 m), on 6 March 1988. This occurred exactly 25 years to the day before he was reported missing on Broad Peak, which he climbed on 5 March 2013 with Adam Bielecki, Tomasz Kowalski, and Artur Małek.

See also 
 List of deaths on eight-thousanders
 List of people who disappeared

References 

1954 births
2010s missing person cases
2013 deaths
Mountaineering deaths
Polish mountain climbers
Polish summiters of Mount Everest
Sportspeople from Zakopane